Norman Stevenson Biddulph (21 April 1904 – 27 September 1955) was a British middle-distance runner. He competed in the men's 3000 metres steeplechase at the 1928 Summer Olympics.

References

1904 births
1955 deaths
Athletes (track and field) at the 1928 Summer Olympics
British male middle-distance runners
British male steeplechase runners
Olympic athletes of Great Britain